The 2011 season of the astronomy TV show Jack Horkheimer: Star Gazer started  on January 3, 2011 with guest host Dean Regas of the Cincinnati Observatory. This is the first full season after Jack Horkheimer's death. The series tried out new hosts and settled on Dean Regas and James Albury to be co-hosts on the show.  On October 3, 2011, the title of the series was changed to Star Gazers.   The show's name change was accompanied by the launch of a new Star Gazers website for the series; while, the older Jack Horkheimer: Star Gazer website continued to be maintained and updated as well.


2011 season

References

External links 
  Star Gazer official website
  Star Gazers official website
 

Jack Horkheimer: Star Gazer
2011 American television seasons